Lamarque (Gascon: La Marca) is a commune in the Gironde department in Nouvelle-Aquitaine in southwestern France. It lies in the Médoc, on the left bank of the Gironde estuary.  A small car ferry crosses the estuary to Blaye.

Population

See also
Communes of the Gironde department

References

Communes of Gironde